Tim Blenkiron (born 1970s) is an Australian tennis coach and former professional player.

Born in Adelaide, Blenkiron was a tall right-handed player who achieved a world ranking in doubles. In 1997 he featured in the men's doubles main draw of the US Open with University of Nevada, Las Vegas teammate Luke Smith. He and Smith were the 1997 NCAA Division I doubles champions.

Blenkiron operates the No Quit Tennis Academy in Las Vegas. He is a personal coach of Asia Muhammad and has also worked with Eugenie Bouchard. In 2019 he became inaugural coach of World TeamTennis team the Vegas Rollers.

References

External links
 
 

1970s births
Living people
Australian male tennis players
UNLV Rebels athletes
College men's tennis players in the United States
Tennis players from Adelaide